The 1958 Mississippi State Maroons football team represented Mississippi State University during the 1958 NCAA University Division football season. Although the Maroons finished 6–2–1 the previous year, they were unable to capitalize on the momentum and fell back to last place in the SEC.

Schedule

References

Mississippi State
Mississippi State Bulldogs football seasons
Mississippi State Maroons football